Meskerem Legesse (28 September 1986 – 15 July 2013) was an Ethiopian distance runner. She participated in the 1,500 meters at the 2004 Summer Olympics in Athens. Legesse turned professional and participated in a number of U.S. events at various distances.

She set the world junior record in the indoor 800m with a time of 2:01.03 at Fayetteville, United States on 14 February 2004. At the 2004 Olympics, she ran a time of 4:18:03 (twelfth place in a first-round heat), and did not advance to the medal round.

Legesse resided in Westport, Connecticut and had not been in Ethiopia for nine years, since 2004. She retired from running due to a heart condition.

Legesse died suddenly three weeks before she was to give birth. She was with her two-year-old son when she collapsed on 15 July 2013 at a restaurant in Hamden, Connecticut. Doctors were successful in saving her unborn child.

References

External links
Profile at All Athletics

1986 births
2013 deaths
Ethiopian female middle-distance runners
Ethiopian female long-distance runners
Ethiopian female marathon runners
Olympic athletes of Ethiopia
Athletes (track and field) at the 2004 Summer Olympics
Ethiopian expatriate sportspeople in the United States
20th-century Ethiopian women
21st-century Ethiopian women